Borgen is a former borough of Skjeberg municipality in Norway, incorporated into Sarpsborg municipality since 1992.

Attractions
 Isesjøen

Villages in Østfold
Sarpsborg